The Red and the White is a 1967 film directed by Miklós Jancsó and dealing with the Russian Civil War. The original Hungarian title, Csillagosok, katonák, can be translated as "Stars on their Caps" (literally "Stars, soldiers"), which, as with a number of Jancsó film titles, is a quote from a song. The film was listed to compete at the 1968 Cannes Film Festival, but the festival was canceled due to the events of May 1968 in France. It was voted as "Best Foreign Film of 1969" by the French Syndicate of Cinema Critics.

The film, a Soviet-Hungarian co-production, was originally commissioned to celebrate the 50th anniversary of the October Revolution in Russia in which the Bolsheviks seized power. However, Jancsó chose to set the action two years later in 1919 and showed Hungarian irregulars supporting the Communist "Reds" in fighting the Tsarist "Whites" as the two sides battled for control in the hills overlooking the Volga river. As well as deviating on the required setting, Jancsó also chose to use a radically different approach to the film than that expected. Rather than shooting a hagiographic account of the birth of Soviet Communism, Jancsó produced a profoundly anti-heroic film that depicts the senseless brutality of the Russian Civil War specifically and all armed combat in general.

Plot
The film tells the story of the Hungarian branch of the soldiers who, during World War I ended up in Russian captivity. When the revolution breaks out and begins a civil war in Russia, the soldiers are on the side of the Bolsheviks. Some are hoping that this will make it easier to come home. Others feed on sympathy for the ideology of communism. Some have to fight with an army of White Guards, who tend to be very cruel.

Reception
The film was not well received in the Soviet Union, where it was first re-edited to put a more heroic spin on the war for its premiere. The film  had a theatrical release in the USSR November 7, 1967, with a circulation of 112 film copies. The picture was watched by 2,6 million viewers. In Hungary and the West it was favourably received and it had a theatrical release in many countries (opening in the United States on 20 September 1968). It remains one of Jancsó's most widely seen and admired films, although audiences often find it exceedingly difficult to follow. The film's difficulty stems from its lack of central characters and defiant rejection of war film conventions: for example, key moments of action, such as the deaths of certain characters are sometimes shot with a long lens from a distance rather than in close-up, making it unclear what has happened or to whom it has happened. Supporters of the film point out that the hard-to-follow plot merely reflects the confused and meaningless nature of war itself and that Jancsó's aim is to prevent us from emotionally identifying with any one side in the battle of ideologies. For this reason, detractors (and even supporters) often find the film to be "cold" and "mechanical". However, the film's defenders contrast this approach with more conventional anti-war films, which often paradoxically adopt the same visual language and narrative conventions as heroic war films. 

More universally appreciated, however, is the film's dramatic use of black-and-white Cinemascope, with stylized compositions and elegant camera movements, shot by cinematographer Tamás Somló. In this The Red and the White looks forward to later Jancsó films such as Red Psalm (Még kér a nép, 1971) in which the visual language developed by dramatically increasing the shot length, using even more "balletic" camera movements and further stylizing the visual composition to the point of overt symbolism.

Cast
 József Madaras – Hungarian Commander
 Tibor Molnár – Andras
 András Kozák – Laszlo
 Jácint Juhász – Istvan
 Anatoli Yabbarov – Captain Chelpanov
 Sergei Nikonenko – Cossack Officer
 Mikhail Kozakov – Nestor
 Bolot Bejshenaliyev – Chingiz
 Tatyana Konyukhova – Yelizaveta the Matron (as Tatiana Koniukova)
 Krystyna Mikołajewska – Olga
 Viktor Avdyushko – Sailor
 Gleb Strizhenov – Colonel
 Nikita Mikhalkov – White Officer Glazunov

Savely Kramarov also makes an appearance as White Cossack Savva who has a task to execute one of the prisoners of war.

References

External links

1967 films
Hungarian black-and-white films
Films directed by Miklós Jancsó
Hungarian drama films
1960s Hungarian-language films
Films set in Hungary
1967 drama films
Hungary–Soviet Union relations
Soviet drama films
Hungarian multilingual films
Soviet multilingual films
1960s multilingual films
World War I films set on the Eastern Front
Russian Civil War films